Every Maclean was a 19th-century New Zealand politician.

Maclean was elected to Auckland Provincial Council for the Franklin electorate in November 1865 and served until September 1872. He was the 6th Deputy-Superintendent of Auckland Province (July to August 1868, and July 1869 to June 1870).

He was a member of the New Zealand Legislative Council; he was appointed on 11 July 1873, and his membership lapsed on 15 June 1876 due to absence.

Together with his brother Robert, Maclean farmed in Auckland. In 1868 or 1869 (sources differ), they were the first to import Hereford cattle into New Zealand. The first Hereford sire was called Lord Lovell.

Notes

References

People from Auckland
Members of the Auckland Provincial Council
Members of the New Zealand Legislative Council
New Zealand farmers